Überseering BV v Nordic Construction Company Baumanagement GmbH (2002) C-208/00 is a European company law case, concerning the right of freedom of establishment.

Facts
Überseering BV, a Dutch company, was told that because its shares had been all acquired by two German nationals but it had failed to reincorporate under German law, it had no legal identity in Germany and could not, therefore, enforce a contract to develop land in Düsseldorf against Nordic Construction.  German law took the view that companies should only be recognised as having legal rights under the law where their "real" seat was. This was Germany (as Überseering was "really" operating there), but it could not have legal standing unless it was first incorporated under German law. Thus, German law did not follow the "incorporation" view, that it would acknowledge legal standing according to a foreign law when a company was incorporated in the Netherlands. Überseering BV argued that this represented a restriction on its right to freedom of establishment, and this was prohibited by TEC article 43 and 48 (now TFEU articles 49 and 54). The German court referred to the ECJ the question of whether German law could lead to this result.

Judgment
The European Court of Justice held that TEC articles 43 and 48 precluded German courts denying legal capacity to companies like Überseering BV, because it was fundamental that states recognised companies incorporated abroad, regardless of whether member states had conventions on mutual recognition of companies under article 293. Despite change in ownership, Überseering BV was still a valid company in the Netherlands. There was no countervailing justification by any overriding requirements relating to the general interest to not uphold the right of freedom of establishment.

See also

UK company law
European company law

Notes

References

Corporate case law
Court of Justice of the European Union case law
German case law
2002 in case law
2002 in Germany
Dutch case law
2002 in the Netherlands
European Union company case law